The British Chess Championships are organised by the English Chess Federation. The main tournament incorporates the British Championship, the English Chess Championships and the British Women's Chess Championship so it is possible, although it has never happened, for one player to win all three titles in the same competition. The English Women's Chess Championship was also incorporated into this event but did not take place in 2015 and was held as a separate competition in 2016.  Since 1923 there have been sections for juniors, and since 1982 there has been an over-sixty championship. The championship venue usually changes every year and has been held in different locations in England, Scotland, Wales and once on the Isle of Man.

The championship was originally open to citizens of any Commonwealth country and has previously been won by Mir Sultan Khan (India) and Abe Yanofsky (Canada). After the Indian R. B. Ramesh finished first in 2002 and several other Indians took top prizes at the same event, many top Britons declined to compete in the 2003 championship. Following the victory of Indian Abhijit Kunte in 2003 and criticism that the British Championship was not serving the interests of British players, it was announced that starting in 2004 only British and Irish players would be eligible to take part. Players excluded by these rules are however welcome to participate in the Commonwealth Chess Championship.

BCA Congress (1857–1861)
These were the first large tournaments organised by the British Chess Association, international players were allowed to participate.

{| class="sortable wikitable"
! Year !! City !! Winner
|-
| 1857 || Manchester ||  / 
|-
| 1858 || Birmingham ||   / 
|-
| 1860 || Cambridge ||  / 
|-
| 1861 || Bristol ||  /  Lippe
|}

London international tournaments (1862–1883)
In July 1862, Adolf Anderssen won the first international tournament organized by the British Chess Association (BCF Congress), held in London. Second place went to Louis Paulsen, followed by John Owen. This was the first round-robin tournament.
In August 1872, Wilhelm Steinitz won the second British Chess Federation international tourney, held in London. Second place went to Joseph Henry Blackburne. The great London 1883 chess tournament was won convincingly by Johannes Hermann Zukertort (22 points ouf of 26) ahead of Steinitz (19/26).
{| class="sortable wikitable"
! # !!Year !!City !! Winner
|-
| 1* || 1862 || London ||  /  Prussia
|-
| 2* || 1872 || London ||  / 
|-
| 3* || 1883 || London ||  / 
|}

BCA Congress (1885–1899)
In 1884, a new British Chess Association was inaugurated. In July 1885, Isidor Gunsberg won the first British Chess Association championship in London. In August 1886, Blackburne and Amos Burn tied for first in the second British Chess Association championship, held in London. Blackburne won the play-off. In December 1887, Burn and Gunsberg tied for first in the third British Chess Association Congress in London.
{| class="sortable wikitable"
! # !!Year !!City !! Winner
|-
| 1 || 1885 || London ||  / 
|-
| 2 || 1886 || London ||  / 
|-
| 3 || 1887 || London ||  /  
 / 
|-
| 4 || 1888 || Bradford ||  / 
|-
| 5 || 1889 || London ||  / 
|-
| 6 || 1890 || Manchester ||  /  Prussia
|-
| 7 || 1892 || London ||  /  Prussia
|-
| 8 || 1895 || Hastings || 
|-
| 9 || 1899 || London ||  /  Prussia
|}

BCA Challenge Cup (1866–1872) 
The first British Championship was organized by the British Chess Association as an event at the 1866 London Congress.
A rule awarded the B.C.A. Challenge Cup permanently to a player who won two consecutive titles.
John Wisker accomplished this in 1872 by defeating Cecil De Vere in a play-off.
The British Championship was then discontinued until 1904.

{| class="sortable wikitable"
! Year !! City !! Winner
|-
| 1866
| London
| 
|-
| 1869
| London
| 
|-
| 1870
| London
| 
|-
| 1872
| London
| 
|}

British Amateur Championship (1886–1902) 

Ten amateur championships were held between 1886 and 1902, but they did not include the strongest players and were unrepresentative, especially in the earlier years.

{| class="sortable wikitable"
! Year !! City !! Winner
|-
| 1886
| London
| 
|-
| 1887
| London
| 
|-
| 1888
| Bradford
| 
|-
| 1889
| London
| 
|-
| 1890
| Manchester
| 
|-
| 1892
| London
| 
|-
| 1895
| Hastings
| 
|-
| 1897
| Southampton
| 
|-
| 1900
| Bath
| 
|-
| 1902
| Norwich
| 
|}

British Championship (1904–present)
The current championship series was begun by the British Chess Federation in 1904.
The championship was not held in war years.
It was also not held in 1919, 1922, 1927, and 1930 as major international events were then being held in England. José Raúl Capablanca won the BCF Victory Congress held in Hastings 1919 and the 1922 London International tournament, Alexander Alekhine won the 16th BCC Major Open at Portsmouth/Southsea 1923, Aron Nimzowitsch and Savielly Tartakower won at London 1927, and Edgard Colle won at Scarborough 1930. In 1939 the championship was also not held as the British team was in Buenos Aires for the 8th Chess Olympiad. In that time, Max Euwe won an international tournament at Bournemouth 1939, played during the BCC. The women's championship was held in most of those years.
{| class="sortable wikitable"
! Year !! City !! Men's Champion !! Women's Champion
|-
| 1904
| Hastings
| 
| 
|-
| 1905
| Southport
| 
| 
|-
| 1906
| Shrewsbury
| 
| 
|-
| 1907
| London
| 
| 
|-
| 1908
| Tunbridge Wells
| 
| 
|-
| 1909
| Scarborough
| 
| 
|-
| 1910
| Oxford
| 
| 
|-
| 1911
| Glasgow
| 
| 
|-
| 1912
| Richmond
| 
| 
|-
| 1913
| Cheltenham
| 
| 
|-
| 1914
| Chester
| 
| 
|-
| 1915–1918
| –
| no contest
| no contest
|-
| 1919
| Hastings
| no contest
| 
|-
| 1920
| Edinburgh
| 
| 
|-
| 1921
| Malvern
| 
| 
|-
| 1922
| London
| no contest
| 
|-
| 1923
| Southsea
| 
| 
|-
| 1924
| Southport
| 
| 
|-
| 1925
| Stratford-upon-Avon
| 
| 
|-
| 1926
| Edinburgh
| 
| 
|-
| 1927
| –
| no contest
| no contest
|-
| 1928
| Tenby
| 
| 
|-
| 1929
| Ramsgate
| 
| 
|-
| 1930
| Scarborough
| no contest
| 
|-
| 1931
| Worcester
| 
| Amy Eleanor Wheelwright
|-
| 1932
| London
| 
| 
|-
| 1933
| Hastings
| 
| 
|-
| 1934
| Chester
| 
| 
|-
| 1935
| Great Yarmouth
| 
| 
|-
| 1936
| Bournemouth (M)  Nottingham (W)
| 
| 
|-
| 1937
| Blackpool
| 
| 
|-
| 1938
| Brighton
| 
| 
|-
| 1939
| Bournemouth
| no contested Championship
| 
|-
| 1940–1945
| –
| no contest
| no contest
|-
| 1946
| Nottingham
| 
| 
|-
| 1947
| Harrogate
| 
| 
|-
| 1948
| London
| 
| 
|-
| 1949
| Felixstowe
| 
| 
|-
| 1950
| Buxton
| 
| 
|-
| 1951
| Swansea
| 
| 
|-
| 1952
| Chester
| 
| no contest
|-
| 1953
| Hastings
| 
| 
|-
| 1954
| Nottingham
| Alan Phillips
| 
|-
| 1955
| Aberystwyth
| 
| Joan Doulton
|-
| 1956
| Blackpool
| 
| 
|-
| 1957
| Plymouth
| 
| 
|-
| 1958
| Leamington
| 
| 
|-
| 1959
| York
| 
| 
|-
| 1960
| Leicester
| 
| 
|-
| 1961
| Aberystwyth
| 
| 
|-
| 1962
| Whitby
| 
| 
|-
| 1963
| Bath
| 
| 
|-
| 1964
| Whitby
| 
| 
|-
| 1965
| Hastings
| 
| 
|-
| 1966
| Sunderland
| 
| Gillian Moore
|-
| 1967
| Oxford
| 
| Dinah Margaret Dobson
|-
| 1968
| Bristol
| 
| 
|-
| 1969
| Rhyl
| 
| Dinah Margaret Dobson
|-
| 1970
| Coventry
| 
| 
|-
| 1971
| Blackpool
| 
| 
|-
| 1972
| Brighton
| 
| 
|-
| 1973
| Eastbourne
| 
| 
|-
| 1974
| Clacton
| 
| 
|-
| 1975
| Morecambe
| 
| 
|-
| 1976
| Portsmouth
| 
| 
|-
| 1977
| Brighton
| 
| 
|-
| 1978
| Ayr
| 
| 
|-
| 1979
| Chester
| 
| 
|-
| 1980
| Brighton
| 
| 
|-
| 1981
| Morecambe
| 
| 
|-
| 1982
| Torquay
| 
| 
|-
| 1983
| Southport
| 
| Helen Milligan (née Scott)
|-
| 1984
| Brighton
| 
|  (now Thipsay)
|-
| 1985
| Edinburgh
| 
| 
|-
| 1986
| Southampton
| 
| 
|-
| 1987
| Swansea
| 
| 
|-
| 1988
| Blackpool
| 
| 
|-
| 1989
| Plymouth
| 
| 
|-
| 1990
| Eastbourne
| 
| 
|-
| 1991
| Eastbourne
| 
| 
|-
| 1992
| Plymouth
| 
| 
|-
| 1993
| Dundee
| 
| 
|-
| 1994
| Norwich
| 
| 
|-
| 1995
| Swansea
| 
| 
|-
| 1996
| Nottingham
| 
| 
|-
| 1997
| Hove
| Matthew Sadler
| 
|-
| 1998
| Torquay
| 
| 
|-
| 1999
| Scarborough
| 
| 
|-
| 2000
| Street
| 
| 
|-
| 2001
| Scarborough
| 
| 
|-
| 2002
| Torquay
| 
| 
|-
| 2003
| Edinburgh
| 
| 
|-
| 2004
| Scarborough
| 
| 
|-
| 2005
| Isle of Man
| 
| no contest
|-
| 2006
| Swansea
| 
| 
|-
| 2007
| Great Yarmouth
| 
| 
|-
| 2008
| Liverpool
| 
| 
|-
| 2009
| Torquay
| 
| 
|-
| 2010
| Canterbury
| 
| 
|-
| 2011
| Sheffield
| 
| 
|-
| 2012
| North Shields
| 
| 
|-
| 2013
| Torquay
| 
| 
|-
| 2014
| Aberystwyth
| , 
| 
|-
| 2015
| Coventry
| 
| 
|-
| 2016
| Bournemouth
| 
| 
|-
| 2017
| Llandudno
| 
| 
|-
| 2018
| Hull
| 
| 
|-
| 2019
| Torquay
| 
| 
|-
| 2021
| Hull
| 
| 
|-
| 2022
| Torquay
| 
| 
|}

See also 
British Rapidplay Chess Championships

References

External links
BritBase - List of all British Chess Champions from 1904 to present
British Champions 1904 – present.  The English Chess Federation.

Chess national championships
Women's chess national championships
Chess Championship
Chess in the United Kingdom
1904 in chess
Recurring events established in 1904
1904 establishments in the United Kingdom
National championships in the United Kingdom